The 57th Infantry Division (57-ya Pekhotnaya Diviziya) was an infantry formation of the Russian Imperial Army.

Organization
1st Brigade
225th Infantry Regiment
226th Infantry Regiment
2nd Brigade
227th Infantry Regiment
228th Infantry Regiment

References

Infantry divisions of the Russian Empire